Zenon Klemensiewicz (1891 in Tarnów – 1969) was a Polish linguist, specialist in the Polish language, professor of the Jagiellonian University. He fought in World War I and World War II, and took part in the underground education in WWII occupied Poland. He was one of the founders of the Polish Linguistic Society.

He died in the crash of the LOT Polish Airlines Flight 165.

Publikacje 
 Historia Języka Polskiego, PWN Warszawa 1974 (po śmierci autora)

References

1891 births
1969 deaths
Academic staff of Jagiellonian University
Linguists from Poland
Polish politicians
Polish male writers
Victims of aviation accidents or incidents in Poland
People from Tarnów
Place of birth missing